

Naked City: The Complete Studio Recordings is a five disc box set that contains all of the studio albums released by Naked City during their five-year history.

The five discs are accompanied by a book, Eight Million Stories: Naked City Ephemera, which contains a wealth of photos and art as well as testimonials from all five band members and numerous acquaintances, friends, fans and contributors such as Mike Patton, Yamatsuka Eye, Sean Lennon, Mick Harris and Eyvind Kang.

Reception

The Allmusic listing awarded the compilation 4 stars. Writing for Pitchfork Media, Chris Dalen stated "Naked City will always be Zorn's "coolest" project, the best vehicle for his early ideas, and one of the most intriguing ensembles its members ever joined. And now, Zorn can inter it in a single box and once again set it aside." All About Jazz correspondent, Mark Corroto, labelled it "Probably as dangerous a music as has ever been produced."

Track listing
All tracks by John Zorn, except where noted.

Disc One (Naked City)
"Batman" – 2:04
"The Sicilian Clan" (Ennio Morricone) – 3:32
"You Will Be Shot" – 1:31
"Latin Quarter" – 4:11
"A Shot in the Dark" (Henry Mancini) – 3:13
"Reanimator" – 1:43
"Snagglepuss" – 2:20
"I Want to Live" (Johnny Mandel) – 2:12
"Lonely Woman" (Ornette Coleman) – 2:45
"Igneous Ejaculation" – 0:24
"Blood Duster" – 0:16
"Hammerhead" – 0:11
"Demon Sanctuary" – 0:41
"Obeah Man" – 0:20
"Ujaku" – 0:30
"Fuck the Facts" – 0:14
"Speedball" – 0:43
"Chinatown" (Jerry Goldsmith) – 4:28
"Punk China Doll" – 3:04
"N.Y. Flat Top Box" – 0:45
"Saigon Pickup" – 4:50
"The James Bond Theme" (John Barry) – 3:06
"Den of Sins" – 1:15
"Contempt" (Georges Delerue) – 2:54
"Graveyard Shift" – 3:32
"Inside Straight" – 4:16

Disc Two (Grand Guignol)
"Grand Guignol" – 17:49
"Blood Is Thin" – 1:03
"Thrash Jazz Assassin" – 0:48
"Dead Spot" – 0:35
"Bonehead" – 0:56
"Piledriver" – 0:37
"Shangkuan Ling-Feng" – 1:18
"Numbskull" – 0:32
"Perfume of a Critic's Burning Flesh" – 0:28
"Jazz Snob Eat Shit" – 0:27
"The Prestidigitator" – 0:47
"No Reason to Believe" – 0:27
"Hellraiser" – 0:42
"Torture Garden" – 0:39
"Slan" – 0:26
"The Ways of Pain" – 0:35
"The Noose" – 0:12
"Sack of Shit" – 0:48
"Blunt Instrument" – 0:56
"Osaka Bondage" – 1:16
"Shallow Grave" – 0:43
"Kaoru" – 0:54
"Dead Dread" – 0:49
"Billy Liar" – 0:15
"Victims of Torture" – 0:26
"Speedfreaks" – 0:51
"New Jersey Scum Swamp" – 0:44
"S&M Sniper" – 0:16
"Pig Fucker" – 0:27
"Cairo Chop Shop" – 0:24
"Facelifter" – 0:57
"Whiplash" – 0:23
"The Blade" – 0:43
"Gob of Spit" – 0:28
"La Cathedrale Engloutie" – 6:24 (Claude Debussy)
"Three Preludes Op. 74: Douloureux, Déchirant" – 1:17 (Alexander Scriabin)
"Three Preludes Op. 74: Très Lent, Contemplatif" – 1:43 (Scriabin)
"Three Preludes Op. 74: Allegro Drammatico" – 0:49 (Scriabin)
"Prophetiae Sybillarum" – 1:46 (Orlande de Lassus)
"The Cage" – 2:01 (Charles Ives)
Vocals by Bob Dorough
"Louange à L'Éternité de Jésus" – 7:08 (Olivier Messiaen)
"Grand Guignol (Version Vocale)" – 17:40
Vocals by Mike Patton

Disc Three (Heretic)
All tracks by Naked City.
"Main Titles" – 1:28
"Sex Games" – 2:23
"The Brood" – 2:49
"Sweat, Sperm + Blood" – 2:04
"Vliet" – 0:50
"Heretic 1" – 2:33
"Submission" – 4:23
"Heretic 2" – 1:46
"Catacombs" – 2:46
"Heretic 3" – 2:43
"My Master, My Slave" – 2:23
"Saint Jude" – 2:13
"The Conqueror Worm" – 2:32
"Dominatrix 2B" – 2:15
"Back Through the Looking Glass" – 2:40
"Here Come the 7,000 Frogs" – 1:59
"Slaughterhouse/Chase Sequence" – 2:19
"Castle Keep" – 1:49
"Mantra of Resurrected Shit" – 1:43
"Trypsicore" – 1:47
"Fire and Ice (Club Scene)" – 2:37
"Crosstalk" – 1:41
"Copraphagist Rituals" – 0:53
"Labyrinth" – 5:49

Disc Four (Radio)
"Asylum" – 1:55
"Sunset Surfer" – 3:24
"Party Girl" – 2:33
"The Outsider" – 2:28
"Triggerfingers" – 3:31
"Terkmani Teepee" – 3:59
"Sex Fiend" – 3:32
"Razorwire" – 5:31
"The Bitter and the Sweet" – 4:52
"Krazy Kat" – 1:54
"The Vault" – 4:44
"Metal Tov" – 2:07
"Poisonhead" – 1:09
"Bone Orchard" – 3:54
"I Die Screaming" – 2:29
"Pistol Whipping" – 0:57
"Skatekey" – 1:24
"Shock Corridor" – 1:08
"American Psycho" – 6:09

Disc Five (Absinthe & Leng Tch'e)
"Val de Travers" – 6:19
"Une Correspondance" – 5:09
"La Feé Verte" – 5:12
"Fleurs du Mal" – 4:08
"Artemisia Absinthium" – 4:34
"Notre Dame de l'Oubli" (for Olivier Messiaen) – 4:51
"Verlaine Part One: Un Midi Moins Dix" – 4:28
"Verlaine Part Two: La Bleue" – 6:03
"...Rend Fou" – 6:16
"Leng Tch'e" – 31:38

Personnel

Performance
Joey Baron – drums
Bob Dorough – vocals
Yamataka Eye – vocals
John Zorn – alto saxophone, vocals, arrangements
Bill Frisell – guitar
Fred Frith – bass
Wayne Horvitz – keyboards
Mike Patton – vocals

Production

Scott Ansell – engineer
Jason Baker – engineer
Scott Bellmer – mastering
Martin Bisi – engineer
Oliver Di Cicco – engineer
Alec Head – engineer
Scott Hull – digital editing, mastering
Bob Hurwitz – executive producer
Hoover Le – assistant engineer
Bob Ludwig – mastering

Man Ray – cover photo
Roger Moutenot – engineer, mixing
Seigen Ono – engineer
Mike Patton – author
Maruo Suehiro – illustrations
Kazunori Sugiyama – associate producer
Tanaka Tomoyo – design
Lisa Wells – typesetting
Takahashi Yukihiro – photo typesetting
John Zorn – production, liner notes

References

Albums produced by John Zorn
Naked City (band) albums
John Zorn compilation albums
2005 compilation albums
Tzadik Records compilation albums